Mark David Stoneman  (born 29 July 1939) is a former Australian politician.

Early life
He was born in Wellington, New South Wales, and was a grazier before entering politics.

Political career
After moving to Queensland he was active in the National Party, and in 1983 was elected to the Queensland Legislative Assembly as the member for Burdekin.

In 1989 he was appointed Minister for Primary Industries, but later that year Labor won office.

In opposition Stoneman became Shadow Treasurer and Opposition Spokesman for Pastoral and Sugar Industries, moving to Employment, Regional Development and Industrial Relations in 1991 and to Economic Development, Trade and Consumer Affairs in 1992. He left the front bench in 1994, but when the Borbidge government came to power in 1996 he was appointed Parliamentary Secretary to the Premier and the government's North Queensland representative. 

He retired in 1998.

Personal life
He married Joan Elizabeth Ingrey on 3 March 1962, and they have 1 son and 3 daughters.

References

1939 births
Living people
National Party of Australia members of the Parliament of Queensland
Members of the Queensland Legislative Assembly
Members of the Order of Australia